Lepidodactylus sacrolineatus is a species of gecko. It is endemic to Papua New Guinea.

References

Lepidodactylus
Reptiles described in 2020
Endemic fauna of Papua New Guinea
Reptiles of Papua New Guinea
Taxa named by Edward Frederick Kraus
Taxa named by Paul M. Oliver
Geckos of New Guinea